Limneriini is a tribe of ichneumon wasps in the subfamily Campopleginae.

Genera 
Alcima - Bathyplectes - Benjaminia - Biolysia - Callidora - Campoletis - Cymodusa - Diadegma - Dolophron - Dusona - Echthronomas - Eriborus - Eripternus - Gonotypus - Hyposoter - Lathroplex - Lathrostizus - Leptocampoplex - Leptoperilissús - Macrulus - Macrus - Melalophacharops - Meloboris - Menaca - Nemeritis - Nepiera - Nepiesta - Olesicampe - Pyracmon - Rhimphoctona - Sesioplex - Spudastica - Tranosema - Tranosemella

References

External links 

 

Campopleginae
Parasitica tribes